The men's decathlon competition at the 2016 Summer Olympics in Rio de Janeiro, Brazil. The event was held at the Olympic Stadium between 17 and 18 August.

The medals were presented by Dagmawit Girmay Berhane, IOC member, Ethiopia and Bernard Amsalem, Council Member of the IAAF.

Competition format
The decathlon consists of ten track and field events, with a points system that awards higher scores for better results in each of the ten components. The athletes all compete in one competition with no elimination rounds.

Schedule
All times are Brasilia Time (UTC-3)

Records
, the existing World and Olympic records were as follows.

Records set during this event

Detailed results

100 metres
The 100 metres was held on 17 August at 09:30.

Long jump
The long jump was held on 17 August at 10:35.

Note: Eelco Sintnicolaas of the Netherlands did not compete.

Shot put
The shot put was held on 17 August at 12:15.

High jump
The high jump was held on 17 August at 17:45.

Note: Leonid Andreev of Uzbekistan, Rico Freimuth of Germany, and Willem Coertzen of South Africa did not compete.

400 metres
The 400 metres was held on 17 August at 21:30.

Note: Pieter Braun of the Netherlands did not compete.

110 metres hurdles
The 110 metres hurdles was held on 18 August at 09:30.

Discus throw
The discus throw was held on 18 August at 10:25.

Pole vault
The pole vault was held on 18 August at 13:25.

Note: Oleksiy Kasyanov of Ukraine did not compete.

Javelin throw

The javelin throw was held on 18 August at 18:35.

Note: Mihail Dudaš of Serbia did not compete.

1500 metres
The 1500 metres was held on 18 August at 21:45.

Overall results
Eaton secured his second Olympic title, with an Olympic record-tying score of 8893.
Key

References

Men's decathlon
2016
Men's events at the 2016 Summer Olympics